Bimbagu is  a town in the Bunkpurugu-Yunyoo District of the Northern Region.

Notable people
Larry Bimi

References

Populated places in the Northern Region (Ghana)